David Alexander Pendleton (born February 2, 1967) is a former Minority Floor Leader of the Hawaii House of Representatives, from 1998 until 2002. As a member of the Republican Party, he served four two-year terms (1996-2004) as a state representative for Kailua and Kaneohe.

Biography

Early life and education
Pendleton, whose grandmother immigrated from Ilocos Norte to Hawaii in 1930, was born in California before moving to Hawaii while in preschool. Attending Hawaiian Mission Academy, he initially pursued a pre-medicine curriculum before settling on a double major in both history and political science at La Sierra University. He graduated from La Sierra in the Honors Program and magna cum laude. Earning a Master of Arts in Religion from Loma Linda University, becoming a minister before earning a Juris Doctor from USC and was admitted to the bar in California and Hawaii.

Early work
In 1985, Pendleton started his experience with public service by interning with the Hawaii Lieutenant Governor's Office. After graduating from USC he taught at San Gabriel Academy, before becoming the Associate Vice President for Student Life at La Sierra University. Beginning in 1995, Pendleton practiced law in Hawaii with two plaintiffs' firms before serving as an administrator and in-house counsel to a non-profit. He was a member of the 1998 class of the Pacific Century Fellows.

Political office
Starting in 1996, Pendleton served as the Representative of the 49th District (which was originally the 50th District) in the Hawaii House of Representatives; while in the House, Pendleton was the Minority Whip, Assistant Minority Leader, and finally the Minority Floor Leader.

In 2000, along with Governor Lingle, Pendleton sued the Hawaii State Legislature to open closed-door conference committee meetings so that the public could attend. Later in 2000, Pendleton was a delegate at the Republican National Convention. In 2002, Pendleton was thought to be a potential candidate for the office of Lieutenant Governor of Hawaii, and joined the Legislative Advisory Board of the Heartland Institute. In 2004, Pendleton lost his reelection by 123 votes, after being the target of negative mailers that Noemi Pendleton called "dirty campaigning".

Later work
Pendleton later worked on Governor Lingle's staff, and was appointed to the Labor and Industrial Relations Appeals Board for a ten-year term beginning in 2006. Despite formally being a Seventh-day-Adventist minister, Pendleton converted to Catholicism in 2008.

See also
List of Asian American jurists

References

Further reading

1967 births
Living people
American Christian clergy
American former Protestants
American politicians of Filipino descent
Asian-American people in Hawaii politics
Catholics from California
Converts to Roman Catholicism from Adventism
Former Seventh-day Adventists
Hawaii politicians of Filipino descent
Hawaii state court judges
La Sierra University alumni
Loma Linda University alumni
Republican Party members of the Hawaii House of Representatives
People from Glendale, California
USC Gould School of Law alumni
Asian conservatism in the United States